Darcy Furber is a Canadian politician who was elected to represent the electoral district of Prince Albert Northcote in the Legislative Assembly of Saskatchewan in the 2007 election. He is a member of the New Democratic Party.

References

Saskatchewan New Democratic Party MLAs
Living people
1972 births
Politicians from Prince Albert, Saskatchewan
21st-century Canadian politicians